Mario Paonessa (born 9 December 1990) is an Italian rower. A two-time World Championship medallist, he competed in the men's four at the 2012 Summer Olympics, and the men's eight event at the 2016 Summer Olympics.

Career 
Paonessa began rowing at the age of nine, encouraged by his father who was also a rower.

In 2008, he was part of the Italian junior quadruple sculls team that won silver at the World Championships.  He was then part of the Italian under-23 men's four that won the U23 World title in 2010.  A year later, his team won silver in the same event.

His first senior medal was a bronze medal at the 2011 European Championships in the men's four.  It was also in this event that he made his Olympic debut in 2012.  In 2012 he was also part of the Italian men's eight that won silver medal at the European Championships.

At the 2016 World Championships, Paonessa and Vincenzo Capelli with cox Andrea Riva won the bronze medal in the coxed pair.  The following year, Paonessa won another World Championship bronze, this time in the men's eight.

References

External links
 

1990 births
Living people
Italian male rowers
Olympic rowers of Italy
Rowers at the 2012 Summer Olympics
Rowers at the 2016 Summer Olympics
World Rowing Championships medalists for Italy
Rowers of Fiamme Gialle
Sportspeople from the Province of Naples